Rowlandson is an English surname meaning son of Rowland or Roland.

Bearers of the name include:

Alfred Cecil Rowlandson (1865–1922), Australian publisher
James Rowlandson (1577-1639),  English Canon of Windsor
Mary Rowlandson (c. 1637–1711), colonial American woman, captured by Native Americans, who described her experiences
Thomas Rowlandson (1756–1827), English artist and caricaturist

References

English-language surnames
Patronymic surnames
Surnames from given names